The 1954–55 Spartan League season was the 37th in the history of Spartan League. The league consisted of 16 clubs.

League table

The division featured 16 clubs, 14 from last season and 2 new clubs: 
 Letchworth Town
 Tring Town

References

Spartan League seasons
9